Porth yr Ogof is a cave located near the village of Ystradfellte, near the southern boundary of the Brecon Beacons National Park in Wales. It lies on the course of the Afon Mellte, a river whose name translates as ‘lightning’, commonly explained as a reference to the flashy' nature of the river, i.e. rising and falling rapidly in response to rainfall. The cave was used as a show cave many years ago, but is not as attractive as more decorated caves such as Dan yr Ogof, and so today is more often used to introduce people to cave exploration.

Cave features
Porth yr Ogof is most often entered through the wide main entrance, either using a dry ledge on the left or by wading through the knee-deep river to the centre and right. The second most used entrance is called the Workman's or Tradesman's Entrance. A passage in the left of this entrance leads to a mud cavern. Challenging elements of the cave interior include the "Wormhole" (a curving crawl tube on the right wall of the main entrance), the "Letterbox" (a rectangular space in the passage) and the "Creek", further inside the cave. There are also two features named the "Washing Machine", both of which feature large expanses of water.

Porth yr Ogof is now uncommercialised, and is used as a training cave for caving. There are two short potholes easily accessible to amateur potholers. The cave is generally wet. White Horse Pool, named after the shape of the calcite deposit on the back wall, is several metres in depth despite the shallowness of the edges, and there are many sumps (completely flooded passageways), the majority of which exist in the portions of the cave north of the Tradesman's Entrance.

Deaths

Geological and human history
'Porth yr Ogof' is Welsh, translated as 'gateway to the cave'. The cave lies in the valley of the Afon Mellte and is located in a comparatively narrow band of Carboniferous Limestone. Except after periods of heavy rain, the river bed is largely dry downstream of Ystradfellte, the river only rising to the surface again just before the cave.

The cave has been known to humans for many centuries, but because of the passageway's susceptibility to severe flooding there has been no evidence found of any prehistoric human habitation. The cave and its many visible fossils were mentioned in the writings of Edward Lhuyd, and in the 19th century it was mentioned again by the first pioneers of caving.

References

Tourist attractions in Powys
Caves of Powys
Fforest Fawr
Closed show caves in the United Kingdom